Maria Elfira Christina (born 21 October 1986) is a former Indonesian badminton player affiliated with Djarum club. She was part of the Indonesian junior team that won the bronze medal at the 2004 Asian Junior Championships in the girls' team event. Christina was the champion of the 2008 Spanish Open in the singles event. In the national event, she has collected five titles at the National circuit tournament. She is now works as a coach at the PB Djarum.

Achievements

BWF International Challenge/Series 
Women's singles

Mixed doubles

  BWF International Challenge tournament
  BWF International Series tournament

References

External links 
 

1986 births
Living people
People from Grobogan Regency
Sportspeople from Central Java
Indonesian female badminton players
Badminton coaches
21st-century Indonesian women
20th-century Indonesian women